St. Paul Presbyterian Church may refer to:

St. Paul Presbyterian Church in Cordele, Georgia, in the Gillespie-Selden Historic District
St. Paul Presbyterian Church (Lowland, Tennessee)

See also
St. Paul Church (disambiguation)